Sumitra (IAST: Sumitrā) is a princess of Kashi in Hindu mythology. The wise Sumitra is the third queen consort of Dasharatha, the king of Kosala, who ruled from Ayodhya. She is the mother of the twins Lakshmana and Shatrughna as mentioned in the Hindu epic, the Ramayana.

Etymology 
The name Sumitra is of Sanskrit origin, and could be divided into Su meaning good, and Mitra, meaning friend. Thus, her name means 'a good friend' or 'one with a friendly nature'. She is known in other languages as Tamil: சுமித்திரை, Burmese: Thumitra, Malay: Samutra, Khmer  and   Samutthra Thewi).

Legend 
At the sacrifice conducted by Rishyasringa to obtain sons for the childless Dasharatha, a divine being emerged from the flames with a golden vessel filled with divine payasam. Dasharatha offered half to Kausalya, a quarter (literally half of that which remained) to Sumitra, an eighth to Kaikayi (again, half of that which remained), and then, on reflection, presented the final eighth to Sumitra. Having received two portions, Sumitra became the mother of twin sons.

Considered the wisest of Dasharatha's three wives, she supported Lakshmana's decision to accompany Rama, to serve him during his exile, and comforted Kaushalya after the departure of her son.

Neither the principal queen nor the favoured wife, Sumitra was single-minded in her devotion to her husband and to the senior queen consort, Kausalya. She was also known for encouraging her son Lakshmana to go into exile with Rama. She is described to have found a lot of happiness around her son Lakshmana, with the latter being described as the 'enhancer of her joy'. While Valmiki is silent on her parentage, later texts variously described her as a princess of Kashi or of Magadha, and belonging to the Haiheya clan.

Literature 
After the exile of Rama, Sita, and Lakshmana, the benevolent Sumitra consoles Queen Kausalya with her persuasive words: 

During Rama's consecration, Sumitra offers her blessings to the prince:

References

Solar dynasty

Characters_in_the_Ramayana